AaB is an association football club from Aalborg, Denmark. The team has participated in four seasons of the UEFA Champions League, eight seasons of the UEFA Cup and Europa League, three seasons of the UEFA Cup Winners' Cup, and four seasons of the UEFA Intertoto Cup.

Key

 S: Seasons
 P: Played
 W: Games won
 D: Games drawn
 L: Games lost
 F: Goals for
 A: Goals against
 aet: Match determined after extra time
 a: Match determined by away goals rule
 p: Match determined by penalties

 1R: First round
 2R: Second round
 3R: Third round
 QR: Qualifying round
 2Q: Second qualifying round
 3Q: Third qualifying round
 PO: Play-off round

Statistics

Overview

Matches 

Notes
Note 1: Dynamo Kyiv won their tie against AaB, but, in their first group game against Panathinaikos, they were accused of a failed attempt to bribe referee Antonio López Nieto to get a win. Despite an appeal, they were thrown out of the competition by UEFA and were banned for the subsequent two years. AaB replaced them in the group stage. Dynamo's ban was eventually reduced to just one (current) season.

Record by country of opposition

Additional official appearances
Before the Intertoto Cup was taken over by UEFA in 1995, a number of tournaments were held with AaB taking part in five of them. These matches are considered official. In addition to those matches, AaB also qualified for one season of the Royal League, an official club competition for Scandinavian teams.

Matches

References

AaB Fodbold
Danish football clubs in international competitions